The Social Security (Scotland) Act 2018 is an Act of the Scottish Parliament to allow for the devolution of aspects of the social security system to the Scottish Parliament as part of the devolution settlement agreed by the Smith Commission after the independence referendum in 2014.

This Act provides for the establishment of the agency to provide social security payments, known as Social Security Scotland.

The Act passed the third and final legislative stage on 25 April 2018, and received royal assent on 1 June 2018.

Acts of the Scottish Parliament 2018